Ibrahim Hakki Pasha ( 1862–1918) was an Ottoman statesman, who served as Grand Vizier of the Ottoman Empire between 1910 and 1911. He served as Ottoman ambassador to Germany and to the Kingdom of Italy.
Hakki Pasha also spent considerable amounts of time in London between February 1913 and the outbreak of World War I, working on negotiations concerning the Berlin-Baghdad Railway and a settlement for the Second Balkan War. During that visit, Hakki Pasha met with King George VI. He was awarded the Order of Karađorđe's Star.

References

1862 births
1918 deaths
Diplomats from Istanbul
Ambassadors of the Ottoman Empire to Italy
20th-century Grand Viziers of the Ottoman Empire
Ottoman people of the Italo-Turkish War
Ministers of Foreign Affairs of the Ottoman Empire
Politicians from Istanbul